The 1888 United States presidential election was the 26th quadrennial presidential election, held on Tuesday, November 6, 1888. Republican nominee Benjamin Harrison, a former Senator from Indiana, defeated incumbent Democratic President Grover Cleveland of New York. It was the third of five U.S. presidential elections (and second within 12 years) in which the winner did not win the national popular vote, which would not occur again until the 2000 US presidential election.

Cleveland, the first Democratic president since the American Civil War, was unanimously re-nominated at the 1888 Democratic National Convention. Harrison, the grandson of former President William Henry Harrison, emerged as the Republican nominee on the eighth ballot of the 1888 Republican National Convention. He defeated other prominent party leaders such as Senator John Sherman and former Governor Russell Alger. This is the first election since 1840 that an incumbent president lost re-election. 

Tariff policy was the principal issue in the election, as Cleveland had proposed a dramatic reduction in tariffs, arguing that high tariffs were unfair to consumers. Harrison took the side of industrialists and factory workers who wanted to keep tariffs high. Cleveland's opposition to Civil War pensions and inflated currency also made enemies among veterans and farmers. On the other hand, he held a strong hand in the South and border states, and appealed to former Republican Mugwumps.

Cleveland won a plurality of the popular vote, but Harrison won the election with a majority in the Electoral College, marking the only time in which an incumbent president of either party lost a re-election bid despite winning the popular vote as of 2023. Harrison swept almost the entire North and Midwest, including narrowly carrying the swing states of New York and Indiana. This was the first time that Democrats won the popular vote in consecutive elections since 1856.

Nominations

Republican Party nomination 

The Republican candidates were former Senator Benjamin Harrison from Indiana; Senator John Sherman from Ohio; Russell A. Alger, the former governor of Michigan; Walter Q. Gresham from Indiana, the former Secretary of the Treasury; Senator William B. Allison from Iowa; and Chauncey Depew from New York, the president of the New York Central Railroad.

By the time Republicans met in Chicago on June 19–25, 1888, frontrunner James G. Blaine had withdrawn from the race because he believed that only a harmonious convention would produce a Republican candidate strong enough to upset incumbent President Cleveland. Blaine realized that the party was unlikely to choose him without a bitter struggle. After he withdrew, Blaine expressed confidence in both Benjamin Harrison and John Sherman. Harrison was nominated on the eighth ballot.

The Republicans chose Harrison because of his war record, his popularity with veterans, his ability to express the Republican Party's views, and the fact that he lived in the swing state of Indiana. The Republicans hoped to win Indiana's 15 electoral votes, which had gone to Cleveland in the previous presidential election. Levi P. Morton, a former New York City congressman and ambassador, was nominated for vice-president over William Walter Phelps, his nearest rival.

Democratic Party nomination 

Democratic candidates:

The Democratic National Convention held in St. Louis, Missouri, on June 5–7, 1888, was harmonious. Incumbent President Cleveland was re-nominated unanimously without a formal ballot. This was the first time an incumbent Democratic president had been re-nominated since Martin Van Buren in 1840.

After Cleveland was re-nominated, Democrats had to choose a replacement for Thomas A. Hendricks. Hendricks ran unsuccessfully as the Democratic nominee for vice-president in 1876, but won the office when he ran again with Cleveland in 1884. Hendricks served as vice-president for only eight months before he died in office on November 25, 1885. Former Senator Allen G. Thurman from Ohio was nominated for vice-president over Isaac P. Gray, his nearest rival, and John C. Black, who trailed behind. Gray lost the nomination to Thurman primarily because his enemies brought up his actions while a Republican.

The Democratic platform largely confined itself to a defense of the Cleveland administration, supporting reduction in the tariff and taxes generally as well as statehood for the western territories.

Prohibition Party nomination

Nominees 

The 5th Prohibition Party National Convention assembled in Tomlinson Hall in Indianapolis, Indiana. There were 1,029 delegates from all but three states.

Clinton B. Fisk was nominated for president unanimously. John A. Brooks was nominated for vice-president.

Union Labor Party nomination

Nominees 

The Union Labor Party National Convention assembled in Cincinnati, Ohio. The Union Labor Party had been formed in 1887 in Cincinnati.

The convention nominated Alson Streeter for president unanimously. He was so widely popular that no ballot was necessary, instead, he was nominated by acclamation. Samuel Evans was nominated for vice president but declined the nomination. Charles E. Cunningham was later selected as the vice-presidential candidate.

The Union Labor Party garnered nearly 150,000 popular votes, but failed to gain widespread national support. The party did, however, win two counties.

United Labor Party nomination 

The United Labor Party convention nominated Robert H. Cowdrey for president on the first ballot. W.H.T. Wakefield of Kansas was nominated for vice-president over Victor H. Wilder from New York by a margin of 50–12.

Greenback Party 
The Greenback Party was in decline throughout the entire Cleveland administration. In the election of 1884, the party failed to win any House seats outright, although they did win one seat in conjunction with Plains States Democrats (James B. Weaver) and a handful of other seats by endorsing the Democratic nominee. In the election of 1886, only two dozen Greenback candidates ran for the House, apart from another six who ran on fusion tickets. Again, Weaver was the party's only victor. Much of the Greenback news in early 1888 took place in Michigan, where the party remained active.

In early 1888, it was not clear if the Greenback Party would hold another national convention. The fourth Greenback Party National Convention assembled in Cincinnati on May 16, 1888. So few delegates attended that no actions were taken. On August 16, 1888, George O. Jones, chairman of the national committee, called a second session of the national convention. The second session of the national convention met in Cincinnati on September 12, 1888. Only seven delegates attended. Chairman Jones issued an address criticizing the two major parties, and the delegates made no nominations.

With the failure of the convention, the Greenback Party ceased to exist.

American Party nomination 
The American Party held its third and last National Convention in Grand Army Hall in Washington, DC. This was an Anti-Masonic party that ran under various party labels in the northern states.

When the convention assembled, there were 126 delegates; among them were 65 from New York and 15 from California. Delegates from the other states bolted the convention when it appeared that New York and California intended to vote together on all matters and control the convention. By the time the presidential balloting began, there were only 64 delegates present.

The convention nominated James L. Curtis from New York for president and James R. Greer from Tennessee for vice-president. Greer declined to run, so Peter D. Wigginton of California was chosen as his replacement.

Equal Rights Party nomination 
The second Equal Rights Party National Convention assembled in Des Moines, Iowa. At the convention, mail-in ballots were counted. The delegates cast 310 of their 350 ballots for the following ticket: Belva A. Lockwood for president and Alfred H. Love for vice-president. Love declined the nomination, and was replaced with Charles S. Welles of NY.

Industrial Reform Party nomination 
The Industrial Reform Party National Convention assembled in Grand Army Hall, Washington, DC. There were 49 delegates present. Albert Redstone won the endorsement of some leaders of the disintegrating Greenback Party. He told the Montgomery Advertiser that he hoped to carry several states, including Alabama, New York, North Carolina, Arkansas, Pennsylvania, Illinois, Iowa, and Missouri.

General election campaign

Issues 

Cleveland set the main issue of the campaign when he proposed a dramatic reduction in tariffs in his annual message to Congress in December 1887. Cleveland contended that the tariff was unnecessarily high and that unnecessary taxation was unjust taxation. The Republicans responded that the high tariff would protect American industry from foreign competition and guarantee high wages, high profits, and high economic growth.

The argument between protectionists and free traders over the size of the tariff was an old one, stretching back to the Tariff of 1816. In practice, the tariff was practically meaningless on industrial products, since the United States was the low-cost producer in most areas (except woolens), and could not be undersold by the less efficient Europeans. Nevertheless, the tariff issue motivated both sides to a remarkable extent.

Besides the obvious economic dimensions, the tariff argument also possessed an ethnic dimension. At the time, the policy of free trade was most strongly promoted by the British Empire, and so any political candidate who ran on free trade instantly was under threat of being labelled pro-British and antagonistic to the Irish-American voting bloc. Cleveland neatly neutralized this threat by pursuing punitive action against Canada (which, although autonomous, was still part of the British Empire) in a fishing rights dispute.

Harrison was well-funded by party activists and mounted an energetic campaign by the standards of the day, giving many speeches from his front porch in Indianapolis that were covered by the newspapers. Cleveland adhered to the tradition of presidential candidates not campaigning, and forbade his cabinet from campaigning as well, leaving his 75-year-old vice-presidential candidate Thurman as the spearhead of his campaign.

Blocks of Five 
William Wade Dudley (1842–1909), an Indianapolis lawyer, was a tireless campaigner and prosecutor of Democratic election frauds. In 1888, Benjamin Harrison made Dudley Treasurer of the Republican National Committee. The campaign was the most intense in decades, with Indiana dead even. Although the National Committee had no business meddling in state politics, Dudley wrote a circular letter to Indiana's county chairmen, telling them to "divide the floaters into Blocks of Five, and put a trusted man with the necessary funds in charge of these five, and make them responsible that none get away and that all vote our ticket." Dudley promised adequate funding. His pre-emptive strike backfired when Democrats obtained the letter and distributed hundreds of thousands of copies nationwide in the last days of the campaign. Given Dudley's unsavory reputation, few people believed his denials. A few thousand "floaters" did exist in Indiana—men who would sell their vote for $2. They always divided 50-50 (or perhaps, $5,000-$5,000) and had no visible impact on the vote. The attack on "blocks of five" with the suggestion that pious General Harrison was trying to buy the election did enliven the Democratic campaign, and it stimulated the nationwide movement to replace ballots printed and distributed by the parties with secret ballots.

Murchison letter 
A California Republican named George Osgoodby wrote a letter to Sir Lionel Sackville-West, the British ambassador to the United States, under the assumed name of "Charles F. Murchison," describing himself as a former Englishman who was now a California citizen and asked how he should vote in the upcoming presidential election.  Sir Lionel wrote back and in the "Murchison letter" indiscreetly suggested that Cleveland was probably the best man from the British point of view.

The Republicans published this letter just two weeks before the election, where it had an effect on Irish-American voters exactly comparable to the "Rum, Romanism, and Rebellion" blunder of the previous election: Cleveland lost New York and Indiana (and as a result, the presidency). Sackville-West was removed as British ambassador.

Election results 

The election focused on the swing states of New York, New Jersey, Connecticut, and Harrison's home state of Indiana. Harrison and Cleveland split these four states, with Harrison winning by means of notoriously fraudulent balloting in New York and Indiana. The Republicans won in twenty-six of the forty-four largest cities outside of the Southern United States.

Had Cleveland won his home state, he would have won the electoral vote by an electoral count of 204-197 (201 electoral votes were needed for victory in 1888).  Instead, Cleveland became the third of only five candidates to obtain a plurality or majority of the popular vote but lose their respective presidential elections (Andrew Jackson in 1824, Samuel J. Tilden in 1876, Al Gore in 2000, and Hillary Clinton in 2016).

Cleveland bested Harrison in the popular vote by slightly more than ninety thousand votes (0.8%), though that margin was only made possible by massive disenfranchisement and voter suppression of hundreds of thousands of Republican blacks in the South.  Harrison won the Electoral College by a 233-168 margin, largely by virtue of his 1.09% win in Cleveland's home state of New York.

Four states returned results where the winner won by less than 1 percent of the popular vote. Cleveland earned 24 of his electoral votes from states he won by less than one percent: Connecticut, Virginia, and West Virginia. Harrison earned fifteen of his electoral votes from a state he won by less than 1 percent: Indiana. Harrison won New York (36 electoral votes) by a margin of 1.09%. Despite the narrow margins in several states, only two states switched sides in comparison to Cleveland's first presidential election (New York and Indiana).

Of the 2,450 counties/independent cities making returns, Cleveland led in 1,290 (52.65%) while Harrison led in 1,157 (47.22%). Two counties (0.08%) recorded a Streeter plurality while one county (0.04%) in California split evenly between Cleveland and Harrison.

Upon leaving the White House at the end of her husband's first term, First Lady Frances Cleveland is reported to have told the White House staff to take care of the building since the Clevelands would be returning in four years. She proved correct, becoming the only First Lady to preside at two nonconsecutive administrations.

This was the last election in which the Republicans won Colorado and Nevada until 1904. It was also the last election until 1968 when bellwether Coös County, New Hampshire, did not support the winning candidate. This was the first time in American history that a party was voted out after a single four-year term; this would occur again in 1892, but not for Democrats until 1980. 

Source (Popular Vote): 
Source (Electoral Vote):

Geography of results

Cartographic gallery

Results by state 
Source: Data from Walter Dean Burnham, Presidential ballots, 1836–1892 (Johns Hopkins University Press, 1955) pp 247–57.

Close states 
Margin of victory less than 1% (39 electoral votes):
 Connecticut, 0.22% (336 votes)
 West Virginia, 0.32% (506 votes)
 Indiana, 0.44% (2,348 votes)
 Virginia, 0.53% (1,605 votes)

Margin of victory between 1% and 5% (150 electoral votes):
 New York, 1.09% (14,373 votes)  (tipping point state)
 Ohio, 2.33% (19,599 votes)
 New Jersey, 2.35% (7,148 votes)
 New Hampshire, 2.50% (2,272 votes)
 California, 2.82% (7,087 votes)
 Maryland, 2.94% (6,202 votes)
 Illinois, 2.96% (22,124 votes)
 North Carolina, 4.59% (13,118 votes) 
 Michigan, 4.82% (22,918 votes)
 Missouri, 4.93% (25,691 votes)

Margin of victory between 5% and 10% (93 electoral votes):
 Wisconsin, 6.01% (21,321 votes)
 Tennessee, 6.49% (19,721 votes)
 Iowa, 7.85% (31,726 votes)
 Pennsylvania, 7.97% (79,458 votes)
 Kentucky, 8.32% (28,692 votes)
 Massachusetts, 9.38% (32,302 votes)

In popular culture 

In 1968 the Michael P. Antoine Company produced the Walt Disney Company musical film The One and Only, Genuine, Original Family Band which centers around the election of 1888 and the annexing and subdividing of the Dakota Territory into states (which was a major issue of the election).

See also 
 American election campaigns in the 19th century
 History of the United States (1865–1918)
 1888 United States House of Representatives elections
 1888–89 United States Senate elections
 History of the United States Democratic Party
 History of the United States Republican Party
 Inauguration of Benjamin Harrison
 Third Party System

Footnotes

References

Secondary sources 
 
 Bourdon, Jeffrey Normand. "Trains, Canes, and Replica Log Cabins: Benjamin Harrison's 1888 Front-Porch Campaign for the Presidency." Indiana Magazine of History 110.3 (2014): 246–269. online
 
 
 
   online free
 
 Nevins, Allan. Grover Cleveland: a study in courage (1933), the standard biography
 Oberholtzer, Ellis Paxson. A History of the United States since the Civil War. Volume V, 1888–1901 (1937). pp 1–74.
 
 
 Sievers, Harry.  Benjamin Harrison: from the Civil War to the White House, 1865–1888 (1959), standard biography
 
   excerpt and text search

Primary sources 
 
 The campaign text book of the Democratic party of the United States, for ...1888 (1888)  full text online, the compilation of data, texts and political arguments used by stump speakers across the country
 Cleveland, Grover. Letters and Addresses of Grover Cleveland (1909) online edition
 Cleveland, Grover. The Letters of Grover Cleveland (1937), edited by Allan Nevins.
 Harrison, Benjamin. Speeches of Benjamin Harrison, twenty-third President of the United States (1890), contains his 1888 campaign speeches full text online
 Chester, Edward W  A guide to political platforms (1977) online
 Porter, Kirk H. and Donald Bruce Johnson, eds. National party platforms, 1840–1964 (1965) online 1840–1956

External links 

 Presidential Election of 1888: A Resource Guide from the Library of Congress
 1888 popular vote by counties
 Election of 1888 in Counting the Votes 
The Vote That Failed. Smithsonian Magazine article on Indiana in the 1888 election.

 
Grover Cleveland
Presidency of Benjamin Harrison
Benjamin Harrison
November 1888 events